The West Indies cricket team toured New Zealand in February 1952 and played a two-match Test series against the New Zealand national cricket team. West Indies won the series 1–0 with one match drawn.

Test series summary

First Test

Second Test

References

External links
 Tour home at ESPN Cricinfo
 

1952 in West Indian cricket
1952 in New Zealand cricket
New Zealand cricket seasons from 1945–46 to 1969–70
1951-52
International cricket competitions from 1945–46 to 1960